Rockingham County High School (RCHS) is located in Wentworth, North Carolina, North Carolina. It is located near Rockingham County Middle School, which feeds into the high school.

Academics
Many classes have optional honors credits and the school offers AP credit in the following courses: Biology, Calculus, Language and Composition, Literature and Composition, World History, and US History.

Demographics
62.7% of students are White, 19.8% of students are African-American, and 17.5% of students are of other ethnicities.

Athletics
RCHS is currently a member of the North Carolina High School Athletic Association and competes in the 3-A Mid-State Conference. Their biggest rivals are Reidsville High School (a class 2-A school) and Morehead High School (an in-conference class 3-A school), both of which are also operated by Rockingham County Schools. The school currently fields teams in these sports:

Fall: Cross country, football, cheerleading, men's soccer, football, women's golf, women's tennis, women's volleyball

Winter: Men's basketball, Women's basketball, basketball cheerleading, swimming, wrestling

Spring: Baseball, men's golf, men's tennis, track & field , women's soccer, and softball

Rockingham's baseball team won the state championship in 1996. In the winters of 2002 and 2003, the women's basketball team fell in back-to-back state finals games. The men's and women's golf teams combined have had 11 state championship appearances since 2006.

Notable alumni
Mel Gibson, former NBA player
Jennifer King, first full-time black female coach in NFL history
Bryan Mitchell, MLB pitcher
John Settle, college football coach and former NFL running back
Greg Wittman, former professional basketball player

References

Public high schools in North Carolina
Schools in Rockingham County, North Carolina
Educational institutions established in 1952
1952 establishments in North Carolina